The Kushinagar SF Express is an Indian Railways train running between Lokmanya Tilak Terminus (Mumbai) and Gorakhpur. It is numbered as 22538/22537. The train is named after the town of Kushinagar, an important Buddhist pilgrim centre near Gorakhpur.

The train takes nearly 30 hours to complete the distance of 1693 km.

Main stops

Locomotives
A Bhusawal-based WAP-7 electric loco powers the train for the entire up/down journey.

Coach composition 
The 22538/22537 Kushinagar Express presently has 1 AC First Class, 2 AC 2 tier, 8 AC 3 tier, 5 Sleeper Class, 4 General Unreserved coaches, 2 EOG & 1 AC pantry car. As with most train services in India, coach composition ma

See also
Indian Railways

External links
11015 Kushinagar Express
11016 Kushinagar Express
Kushinagar Express Time-Table

Named passenger trains of India
Passenger trains originating from Gorakhpur
Express trains in India